Pascal Grünwald (born 13 November 1982) is an Austrian former footballer.

References

External links
 

1982 births
Living people
Austrian footballers
Austria international footballers
Association football goalkeepers
WSG Tirol players
FC Wacker Innsbruck (2002) players
FC Red Bull Salzburg players
FC Juniors OÖ players
FK Austria Wien players
Austrian Football Bundesliga players
2. Liga (Austria) players